Gobichettipalayam was a Lok Sabha constituency in Tamil Nadu In Tamil:கோபிசெட்டிபாளையம் மக்களவைத் தொகுதி. It ceased to exist and renamed as Tiruppur constituency after the delimination by Election commission in 2008. Former union minister C Subramaniam lost to P.A. Saminathan Mudaliyar in 1967 from Gobichettipalayam.

Assembly segments
Gobichettipalayam Lok Sabha constituency is composed of the following assembly segments:2009 

1.Gobichettipalayam (Moved to Tiruppur Constituency)

2.Sathiyamangalam (Defunct)

3.Perunthurai (Moved to  Tiruppur Constituency )

4.Bhavani (Moved to Tiruppur Constituency)

5.Anthiyur(SC) (Moved to Tiruppur Constituency )

6.Bhavanisagar (Moved to Nilgiris Constituency )

Members of the Parliament from Gobichettipalayam Constituency

Election results

General Election 2004

General Election 1999

General Election 1998

General Election 1996

General Election 1991

General Election 1989

General Election 1984

General Election 1980

General Election 1977

General Election 1971

General Election 1967

General Election 1962

General Election 1957

References

See also
 Gobichettipalayam
 List of Constituencies of the Lok Sabha

Former Lok Sabha constituencies of Tamil Nadu
Former constituencies of the Lok Sabha
2008 disestablishments in India
Constituencies disestablished in 2008